Antonio Molinari may refer to:

Antonio Molinari (painter) (1655–1704), Venetian baroque painter
Antonio Molinari (bishop)  (1626–1698), Roman Catholic prelate and Bishop of Lettere-Gragnano
Antonio Molinari (runner) (born 1968), Italian distance runner